Vassbygda is a village in the municipality of Orkland in Trøndelag county, Norway. It is located near the mouth of the Trondheimsfjorden across from the town of Brekstad in Ørland municipality. The Brekstad–Valset Ferry lies just east of Vassbygda, connecting it to Brekstad to the north.

References

Villages in Trøndelag
Orkland